The 1902 USFSA Football Championship was the 9th staging of the USFSA Football Championship. The tournament was held on the road between 13 and 20 April 1902. This edition was contested by the four clubs who won their regional championship and it was played in a knock-out format, with only three games played (two semi-finals and a final).

RC Roubaix, champion of the North, won the title by winning the final against Racing Club de France, champion of Paris, by scoring the winning goal in the sixth extra-time, after nearly three hours of play.

Participants
The four participants are the winners of France's regional championships:

Note: Olympique de Marseille, champion of the Littoral, does not seem to want to compete in the French championship.

Bracket

Results

Semi-finals

Final

On the RC France side, the German Walter Aghad is replaced by Graham, while RC Roubaix team is unchanged. The score is tied at one goal at halftime. Graham, with a knee injury, has to leave the field at the start of the second half, leaving RC de France to finish the match with ten men. Despite this, the Parisians netted twice and took the lead by three goals to one, but the Roubaix team also scored twice, equalizing two minutes from the end of the match thanks to a goal from Émile Sartorius.

Referee Jack Wood decides to play extra time for fifteen minutes, with the winning goal. The match seemed endless, but RC Roubaix finally scored five minutes from the end of the sixth overtime, after almost three hours of play, thanks to a 50-yard shot from Peacock.

Winner

References

External link
RSSSF

USFSA Football Championship
1
France